Rittner Buam (local dialect for boys) is a professional Italian ice hockey team from Ritten, Italy, playing in the Alps Hockey League and formerly the Serie A.

History 
The club was founded in 1984 under the name SV Renon (Ritten Sportverein). In 2004, the name was changed to Sport Renon (Ritten Sport) and Ritten Sport Hockey.

Ritten Sport plays its home games in the 1,200-seater Arena Ritten in Klobenstein. During the 2010 playoffs, the "Palaonda" in Bolzano was used.

Honours
Domestic competitions
Serie A
Winners (5): 2013–14, 2015–16, 2016–17, 2017–18, 2018–19

Serie B
Winners (1): 1986, 1999

Coppa Italia
Winners (3): 2009–10, 2013–14, 2014–15

Supercoppa Italiana
Winners (4): 2009, 2010, 2017, 2018, 2019

International competitions
Alps Hockey League
Winners (1): 2016–17
Runners-up (1): 2017–18

References

External links
Official website
Ritten Sport club website
Team profile on eliteprospects.com

Ice hockey teams in Italy
Ice hockey clubs established in 1984
1984 establishments in Italy
Sport in South Tyrol